The Workers' Party of Hungary 2006 – European Left , shortly European Left is a political party in Hungary. It was created in mid-November 2005 from the internal opposition of the Hungarian Workers' Party (then the Hungarian Communist Workers' Party). Its leader is János Fratanolo.

Its request to become a member of the Party of the European Left was accepted by the EL Executive Board, during the meeting held in Geneva from 23 to 25 October 2009.

History
On 8 September 2016, Táncsics – Radical Left Party (then known as the Left Party) announced on its website that the two parties will cooperate in preparation for the 2018 parliamentary election.

In early 2022 Social Democratic Party of Hungary announced on its website that the two parties will cooperate in preparation for the 2022 parliamentary election. Joining forces, the two parties did not manage to stand a single official candidate in the election according to the official website of the election office valasztas.hu. Also in 2022 People' Front announced that they will join Európai Baloldal but will continue as political organization.

See also
Green Left (Hungary)

References

External links
A Mi Időnk
Facebook page

2005 establishments in Hungary
Communist parties in Hungary
Opposition to Viktor Orbán
Party of the European Left member parties
Political parties established in 2005
Left-wing politics in Hungary
Left-wing parties